Warren Island is an island in the Alexander Archipelago of southeastern Alaska, United States. It lies on the Pacific coast just southwest of the community of Edna Bay (on Kosciusko Island). Directly west is Coronation Island and directly north is Kuiu Island. Warren Island has a land area of 47.191 km2 (18.22 sq mi) and no permanent resident population. The entire island has been designated as the Warren Island Wilderness, a part of Tongass National Forest.

References

Islands of the Alexander Archipelago
IUCN Category III
Islands of Prince of Wales–Hyder Census Area, Alaska
Tongass National Forest
Protected areas of Prince of Wales–Hyder Census Area, Alaska
Islands of Alaska
Islands of Unorganized Borough, Alaska
Uninhabited islands of Alaska